Alto Alentejo may refer to:
 Alto Alentejo Province (1936-1976)
 Alto Alentejo (intermunicipal community) (NUTS 3 region)

See also 
 Baixo Alentejo (disambiguation)